Arilda, or Arild, was an obscure female saint from Oldbury-on-Severn in the English county of Gloucestershire. She probably lived in the 5th- or 6th-century and may have been of either Anglo-Saxon or Welsh origin.

Arilda was a virgin martyr who, according to John Leland, was slain by a youth named Municus when she refused to have sex with him.

Two churches in Gloucestershire are dedicated to Arilda, one at Oldbury-on-Severn near her traditional home, a second ("St Arild's Church") at Oldbury-on-the-Hill. Both places were called "Aldberie" at the time of the Domesday Book, suggesting that their names may be derived from the saint.

Leland claims that Arilda lived in Kington, a hamlet in the parish of Oldbury-on-Severn, where there is a holy well bearing Arilda's name. The waters from the well are said to run red with her blood, though a more prosaic explanation is the presence of a red algae of the Hildenbrandia genus.

There was a shrine to Arilda at St Peter's Abbey, Gloucester, which is now Gloucester Cathedral, but it was destroyed after the Dissolution of the Monasteries.

Notes

References 

 G. Jones, "Authority, Challenge and Identity in three Gloucestershire Saints' Cults", Authority and Community in the Middle Ages (ed. Donald Mowbray, Ian P. Wei, Rhiannon Purdie), 1999, pp. 124–127
 Julian M. Luxford, "The art and architecture of English Benedictine monasteries, 1300–1540: a patronage history", Boydell Press, 2005, p. 134
 Alan Thacker, Richard Sharpe, "Local saints and local churches in the early medieval West", Oxford University Press, 2002, p. 509
 David Verey, Gloucestershire: the Vale and the Forest of Dean, The Buildings of England edited by Nikolaus Pevsner, 2nd ed. (1976) , p. 314
 David Verey, Gloucestershire: the Cotswolds, The Buildings of England edited by Nikolaus Pevsner, 2nd ed. (1979) , p. 351

Mercian saints
People from South Gloucestershire District
English Roman Catholic saints
Southwestern Brythonic saints
Anglo-Saxon saints
Late Ancient Christian female saints
5th-century Christian saints
6th-century Christian saints